Étienne-Jehandier Desrochers (1668, Lyon – 1741, Paris) was an 18th-century French engraver best known for his small portraits of his contemporaries.

Some Engravings 
 Collection of engravings in London
 John Theophilus Desaguliers
 "Portrait of John Law, half-length, head turned to the right, with unrolled parchment in left hand; within oval. 1720"
 "Danae, sprawling semi-nude on a richly draped bed… (1700-1702"
 "Prince Eugene of Savoy, head-and-shoulders portrait..."

Main illustrated books 
 Jean de La Fontaine, Fables choisies, Paris & La Haye, chez Henry Van Bulderen, marchand libraire dans le Pooten, à l'enseigne de Mezeray, 1688 [?].
 Nicolas de La Mare, Traité de la police, Paris, Jean & Pierre Cot, 1705-1719; rééd. chez Michel Brunet, 1722.
 Nicolas Malebranche, De la recherche de la vérité..., Paris, chez Michel David, 1712.
 Abbé de Bellegarde, De l'Imitation de Jésus-Christ, traduction nouvelle, plus ample que toutes les précédentes..., Paris, Imprimerie de Jacques Collombat, 1725.
 Évrard Titon du Tillet, Le Parnasse françois, Paris, imprimerie de Jean-Baptiste Coignard fils, 1732.

References 

 "Proceedings of the Royal Academy of Painting and Sculpture (1648-1793)" published by Anatole de Montaiglon from the original records kept at the École des Beaux-Arts in Paris, BSHAF, Paris, J. Baur, 1875-1892

External links 
 Étienne Jehandier Desrochers on data.bnf.fr

Engravers from Lyon
1668 births
1741 deaths